Matt Dunigan (born December 6, 1960) is an American broadcaster and former professional football player and executive. He is a Canadian Football League (CFL) sportscaster for Canadian sports television channel TSN. Dunigan is a former quarterback, coach, and executive in the CFL.  In 2006, Dunigan joined the Canadian Football Hall of Fame, and was voted one of the CFL's Top 50 players (#39) of the league's modern era by Canadian sports network TSN.

In 2008, he was named the host of Road Grill, a Canadian barbecue cooking series on Food Network Canada.

Early life and college football career 
Although born in Ohio, Dunigan was raised in Dallas, Texas, attended Lake Highlands High School and grew up admiring Dallas Cowboys quarterback Roger Staubach. A member of an athletically-inclined family, he enrolled at Louisiana Tech University in 1979, while Tech was classified as an NCAA Division I-A program.  In 1982, Dunigan's senior season, Louisiana Tech began play in Division I-AA.

In his freshman year, Dunigan played in eight games behind incumbent starting quarterback Mark Buchanan. Dunigan was named the starting quarterback for the 1980 season by newly hired head coach Billy Brewer. Dunigan's best collegiate season was in 1982 as a senior, going 222-413 for 2,843 yards, 23 touchdowns and 15 interceptions. Dunigan led the Bulldogs to a 9-2 regular season record, an undefeated 5-0 record in the Southland Conference, a #2 ranking in The Sports Network poll, and the program's first ever berth in the Division I-AA playoffs. After a 38-3 quarterfinal win at home against South Carolina State, the Bulldogs were eliminated from the playoffs in a 17-0 semifinal loss at home to Delaware.

In 44 total games at Louisiana Tech, Dunigan had completed 550 of 1,103 pass attempts for 7,010 yards with 40 touchdowns against 50 interceptions. Dunigan was inducted into the Louisiana Tech University Athletic Hall of Fame in 2011.

College statistics

Professional football career 
Dunigan broke into the CFL in 1983 with the Edmonton Eskimos. In his rookie season, he backed up Warren Moon. Prior to the 1984 CFL Season, Moon left for the NFL's Houston Oilers and the Eskimos became Dunigan's team. He led the Eskimos to back-to-back Grey Cup appearances in 1986 and 87, winning in 1987. He had to watch most of the game from the bench due to injury. His backup during this time was another CFL legend in the making, Damon Allen.

After the 75th Grey Cup victory,  Dunigan tried pursuing a Major League Baseball career. He worked with a scout from the California Angels, then showed up in Florida during spring training. He was hoping to catch on with the Montreal Expos. He was signed to a Class A contract, but then released on the last day.

While Edmonton held on to his rights, they traded him to the British Columbia Lions in a remarkable seven for one trade. He led the Lions to victory in their last eight games, and to the Grey Cup. They lost to Winnipeg 22-21. His second year in Vancouver produced his first losing season, as the team fell to 7-11. He did throw for a career-high 27 touchdowns. However, new management came in, and Dunigan was the first one to go in another seven for one trade, to the Toronto Argonauts.

When he arrived in Toronto, they made the playoffs in 1990, but lost in the Division Final. However, 1991 proved to be a memorable year for the CFL and Argonauts. Canadian actor and comedian John Candy, along with hockey great Wayne Gretzky, and Los Angeles Kings owner Bruce McNall purchased the Argos. Toronto then made noise by signing Notre Dame receiver Raghib "Rocket" Ismail. The Rocket, along with Dunigan and running back Michael "Pinball" Clemons led Toronto to a 13-5 record. After a first round bye, the Argos won against Winnipeg in front of a packed out SkyDome, and advanced to the Grey Cup. However, in that playoff game, Dunigan broke his collarbone. He was able to throw the length of a hotel ballroom after doctors deadened his shoulder. In minus 19 degree weather, he threw two touchdowns and won his second Grey Cup.

He left for the Winnipeg Blue Bombers the following season, where he spent the next three years. The Bombers went to the Grey Cup in 1992, only to lose to the Calgary Stampeders. They returned to the Grey Cup in 1993, and lost to the Edmonton Eskimos. Dunigan watched the 1993 Grey Cup on crutches, after tearing his Achilles tendon. However, the season saw him break a club record throwing for 36 touchdowns.  On July 13, 1994 he made pro football history when he passed for 713 yards in a 50-35 victory over his former team, the Eskimos.

In 1995, the CFL made an attempt to further expand into the United States. The Memphis Mad Dogs tried pursuing Dunigan, but eventually landed Damon Allen. Dunigan landed in Birmingham to play for the Barracudas. This led to his best season statistically, as he passed for 4,911 yards and 34 touchdowns. In the home finale, he broke his throwing hand and watched the rest of the season from the sidelines. The Barracudas would lose in the playoffs to the San Antonio Texans. The American experiment failed, and all the U.S.-based teams folded. The lone exception was the Baltimore Stallions which relocated to Montreal, Quebec.

1996 proved to be Dunigan's last season in the CFL, this time with the Hamilton Tiger-Cats. The TiCats finished third in their division, and lost in the first round of the playoffs. After the season, he retired due to chronic head injuries.

Dunigan finished his career with 43,857 passing yards and 303 passing touchdowns.  In 2006, Dunigan was voted one of the CFL's Top 50 players (#39) of the league's modern era by Canadian sports network TSN.  Dunigan was also elected into the Canadian Football Hall of Fame in 2006.

Post-football career 
After his retirement, Dunigan spent some time at Valdosta State University as their football team's offensive coordinator.

In 1999, Dunigan took a job as a studio analyst with Canadian sports television channel TSN.

In 2004, the Calgary Stampeders lured Dunigan away from TSN and hired him to be their general manager and head coach. After a disappointing 2004 campaign for Calgary, however, Dunigan was fired, and he returned to his job as a television analyst with TSN.

In 2006, on a dare from his family, Dunigan auditioned for the position as host of a barbecue TV series Road Grill, which premièred in 2008 with him as host.  He has also become a cookbook author, using recipes based on the show.

Dunigan is outspoken about the dangerous effect of concussions. He has suffered from memory problems, speech difficulties, balance issues, and memory loss from the numerous concussions he suffered during his playing career.

CFL coaching record

References

External links
CFL Legends – Matt Dunigan
Argos Heroes – Matt Dunigan
Canadian Football Hall of Fame – Matt Dunigan

1960 births
Living people
American color commentators 
American football quarterbacks
American players of Canadian football
BC Lions players
Birmingham Barracudas players
Calgary Stampeders coaches
Canadian Football Hall of Fame inductees
Canadian Football League announcers
Canadian football quarterbacks
Canadian television chefs
Canadian television sportscasters
Edmonton Elks players
Hamilton Tiger-Cats players
Louisiana Tech Bulldogs football players
Sportspeople from Dallas
Toronto Argonauts players
Winnipeg Blue Bombers players
Valdosta State Blazers football coaches
Calgary Stampeders general managers
Players of American football from Dallas
Players of Canadian football from Dallas